Joseph Stickels (15 November 1843 - 6 December 1876) was a sergeant in the United States Army who was awarded the Medal of Honor for gallantry in the American Civil War. He was awarded the medal on 9 April 1865 for actions performed during the Battle of Fort Blakely in Alabama between 2 and 9 April 1865.

Personal life 
Stickels was born on 15 November 1843 in Butler County, Ohio. He married Theresa Jane Meredith Townsend in 1867. He died on 6 December 1873 in Quincy, Illinois of tuberculosis and was buried in Monroe Cemetery in Monroe, Iowa.

Military service 
On 9 April 1865, Stickels captured an unspecified flag during the Battle of Fort Blakely.

Stickels' Medal of Honor citation reads:

Stickels' medal is attributed to Ohio.

References 

1843 births
1876 deaths
People from Butler County, Ohio
American Civil War recipients of the Medal of Honor
People of Ohio in the American Civil War
Union Army non-commissioned officers
19th-century deaths from tuberculosis
Tuberculosis deaths in Illinois
Burials in Iowa